Wojciech Marusarz  (born 28 May 1993) is a retired Polish Nordic combined skier.
He represented Poland at the 2018 Winter Olympics.

References

External links

1993 births
Living people
Polish male Nordic combined skiers 
Olympic Nordic combined skiers of Poland 
Nordic combined skiers at the 2018 Winter Olympics 
Sportspeople from Zakopane
Universiade gold medalists for Poland
Universiade medalists in nordic combined
Competitors at the 2015 Winter Universiade
Competitors at the 2017 Winter Universiade
21st-century Polish people